The Art of the State: Culture, Rhetoric, and Public Management is a book written by Christopher Hood, first published by Oxford University Press in 1998 with a revised edition published in 2000.   In November 1998 it was awarded the W. J. M. Mackenzie award of the Political Studies Association.

Writing in Public Administration Richard J. Stillman II described the book as "a timely and important book, by one of Europe’s
most respected administrative scholars". In a review in the International Public Management Journal Eugene Bardach wrote that "For intellectual scope and ambition, The Art of the State is almost without peer in the recent public management literature".

References

External links
 Book page at Oxford University Press

1998 non-fiction books
2000 non-fiction books
Books about politics of the United Kingdom
Oxford University Press books